The 1952–53 Connecticut Huskies men's basketball team represented the University of Connecticut in the 1952–53 collegiate men's basketball season. The Huskies completed the season with a 17–4 overall record. The Huskies were members of the Yankee Conference, where they ended the season with a 5–1 record. They were the Yankee Conference regular season champions. The Huskies played their home games at Hawley Armory in Storrs, Connecticut, and were led by seventh-year head coach Hugh Greer.

Schedule 

|-
!colspan=12 style=""| Regular Season

Schedule Source:

References 

UConn Huskies men's basketball seasons
Connecticut
1952 in sports in Connecticut
1953 in sports in Connecticut